George Waddell may refer to:

 George Waddell (figure skater) (born 1998), British-Canadian ice dancer
 George Waddell (footballer) (1888–1966), Scottish footballer